Raymonde Guyot (born 1935) is a French film editor. She won the César Award for Best Editing in 1979 and 1986.

References

External links 

1935 births
Living people
French film editors
Film people from Paris
French women film editors